Herman Jan Rouwé (born 20 January 1943) is a retired Dutch rower who competed at the 1964 and 1968 Summer Olympics. In 1964, he won a bronze medal in the coxed pairs event, together with Erik Hartsuiker and Jan-Just Bos. Four years later he finished ninth in the coxed fours competition.

His younger brother Henk was also an Olympic rower.

References

1943 births
Living people
Dutch male rowers
Olympic rowers of the Netherlands
Rowers at the 1964 Summer Olympics
Rowers at the 1968 Summer Olympics
Olympic bronze medalists for the Netherlands
Olympic medalists in rowing
People from Boarnsterhim
Sportspeople from Friesland
Medalists at the 1964 Summer Olympics
21st-century Dutch people
20th-century Dutch people